Massoud Arabshahi (1935–2019), was an Iranian painter, and bas-relief sculptor. He was a leading member of the Saqqakhaneh movement, and was known for his conceptual artwork. Arabshahi had worked in Tehran, Paris, and California.

Early life and education 
Massoud Arabshahi was born in 1935 in Tehran, Pahlavi Iran. He has attended the Public High School for Fine Arts in Tehran.

In 1968, he graduated from the College of Decorative Arts at Tehran University (now University of Tehran). Arabshahi had studied painting under Shokouh Riazi.

Career 
His sources of inspiration comprise Achaemenid and Assyrian art as well as Babylonian carvings and inscriptions. Combining tradition and modernity. Arabshahi held his first solo exhibition at the Iran-India Centre, Tehran, in 1964, four years before graduating from university.  

Arabshahi work's was created in various mediums, including oil paint-on-canvas, architectural bas-reliefs, and other sculptures. Arabshahi's bas-reliefs were commissioned for the Office for Industry and Mining (1971), Tehran; and for the California Insurance Building (1985) in Santa Rosa, California, U.S..

Arabshahi played a pivotal role in the establishing the Iran Gallery in Tehran, founded in 1964 by Arabshahi, Mansoor Ghandriz, Rouin Pakbaz, Faramarz Pilaram, Sadegh Tabrizi, Mohammad-Reza Jodat, Ghobad Shiva, Sirus Malek, Farshid Mesghali, Parviz Mahallati, Morteza Momayez, and Hadi Hezareiy. After the death of artist Mansoor Ghandriz in 1966, the Iran Gallery was renamed Ghandriz Gallery in his honor; and it remained open until the summer of 1978 during the Iranian Revolution.  

In 1975, Marcos Grigorian founded of the Group of Free Painters and Sculptors in Tehran. The other founding artists included Arabshahi, Gholamhossein Nami, Morteza Momayez, Mir Abdolrez Daryabeigi, and Faramarz Pilaram.

Arabshahi's work has been shown in a number of solo and group exhibitions in Iran, Europe and the United States including Two Modernist Iranian Pioneers, at the Tehran Museum of Contemporary Art, 2001; and Iranian Contemporary Art, Barbican Centre, London, 2001.

He died on September 16, 2019 in Tehran, Iran.

Prizes 
 1964, Ministry of Arts and Culture Prize, 4th Tehran Biennial
 1965, Mother's Day Exhibition Prize, Tehran
 1972, First Prize, Public contest for sculpture ornament at the Farah-abad Park, Tehran
 1973, First Prize, Monaco International Exhibition

Exhibitions 
 1964, Tehran, Iran, India Artistic Center
 1965, Tehran, Iran, Tehran University
 1965, Paris, France, Biennial
 1967, Paris, France, Galerie Solstice
 1967, Paris, France, Museum of Sacred Arts
 1968, U.S.A, Mobile Exhibition of Contemporary Iranian Arts
 1970, Tehran, Iran, Modern Iranian Art: a Retrospective, Iran American Society
 1971, Tehran, Iran, Negar Gallery
 1973, Paris, France, Grand Palais
 1973, Paris, France, Galerie Guiot
 1973, Monaco, France, Monaco International Exhibition, Monte Carlo
 1974, Tehran, Iran, International Exhibition of Arts
 1975, Tehran, Iran, Blue, Takhte Jamshid Gallery
 1975, Tehran, Iran, Volume and Environment, Iran America Society

References

External links 
 Elahe Art Gallery Biography and artworks on Elahe Art Gallery
 Mah Art Gallery Biography, Selected Works and Exhibitions on Mah Art Gallery
 Seyhoun Art Gallery Massoud Arabshahi Exhibit - Seyhoun Gallery, USA

Male painters
Male sculptors
1935 births
2019 deaths
20th-century Iranian painters
20th-century Iranian sculptors
21st-century Iranian painters
21st-century Iranian sculptors
20th-century Iranian male artists
21st-century Iranian male artists
People from Tehran